The 2014 LOTOS Rally Poland was the seventh round of the 2014 World Rally Championship season. The event was based in Mikołajki, Poland, and started on 27 June and finished on 29 June after 24 special stages, totaling 336.6 competitive kilometres.

WRC Champion Sébastien Ogier won the Rally Poland for the first time in his career, taking his fifth victory of the 2014 season.

Entry list

Results

Event standings

Special stages

Power Stage
The "Power stage" was a  stage at the end of the rally.

Standings after the rally

WRC

Drivers' Championship standings

Manufacturers' Championship standings

Other

WRC2 Drivers' Championship standings

WRC3 Drivers' Championship standings

Junior WRC Drivers' Championship standings

References

Results – juwra.com/World Rally Archive
Results – ewrc-results.com

Poland
Rally Poland
Rally of Poland